Rafael Emilio Fortún Chacón (born August 5, 1919 in Camagüey – died June 22, 1982 in Camagüey) was a male sprinter from Cuba, who twice competed for his native country at the Summer Olympics: 1948 and 1952. His major sporting achievement was winning the 100 and 200 m double at the 1951 Pan American Games, beating American sprinter Art Bragg in both events.

Fortun was ranked by the experts of Track and Field News as 10th in the world in 1950 at 100 m and 5th in 1951.

Fortun was a very successful competitor at the Central American and Caribbean Games. He won the 100 m 3 times in row (1946, 1950 and 1954) - the first competitor to achieve such a feat. He also won the 200 m once (in 1946) and was second once (in 1950).

Fortun came from a very humble background in the Cuban province of Camaguey. Originally he was a high jumper but moved the sprints when he realised his talent for them. He also played baseball, a traditional sporting route out of poverty in Cuba at the time. Fortun had to train barefoot until a gift of sporting shoes was made by a local priest. His athletic talent was not appreciated by the authorities in Cuba at the time. He had to seek gifts of money to enable him to attend the Olympic Games of 1948 and 1952 and was fired from his job at the Ministry of Public Affairs for attending the 1951 Pan American Games.

Fortun died of cancer in 1982.

Today his achievements are appreciated more in Cuba, his memory is honoured, for example, in an athletics competition in his home province of Camaguey: the Rafael Fortun Memorial competition in Camaguey City.

Achievements

References

External links
 

1919 births
1982 deaths
Cuban male sprinters
Pan American Games gold medalists for Cuba
Pan American Games silver medalists for Cuba
Pan American Games medalists in athletics (track and field)
Athletes (track and field) at the 1951 Pan American Games
Athletes (track and field) at the 1955 Pan American Games
Athletes (track and field) at the 1948 Summer Olympics
Athletes (track and field) at the 1952 Summer Olympics
Olympic athletes of Cuba
Sportspeople from Camagüey
Central American and Caribbean Games gold medalists for Cuba
Competitors at the 1946 Central American and Caribbean Games
Competitors at the 1950 Central American and Caribbean Games
Competitors at the 1954 Central American and Caribbean Games
Central American and Caribbean Games medalists in athletics
Medalists at the 1951 Pan American Games
20th-century Cuban people